Asperdaphne paramoretonica is a species of sea snail, a marine gastropod mollusk in the family Raphitomidae.

Description

Distribution
This marine species occurs in the China Seas.

References

External links
 Li B.-Q. (Baoquan) & Li X.-Z. (Xinzheng) (2014) Report on the Raphitomidae Bellardi, 1875 (Mollusca: Gastropoda: Conoidea) from the China Seas. Journal of Natural History 48(17-18): 999-1025
 Image of holotype

paramoretonica
Gastropods described in 2014